Amanda Rogers may refer to:

 Amanda Rogers, a Star Trek: The Next Generation character from the episode "True Q"
 Amanda Lee Rogers, birth name of actress Portia de Rossi